The Parc botanique de Kerbihan (10 hectares), sometimes also called the Arboretum d'Hennebont, is a municipal arboretum and botanical garden located near the Rue Gérard Philipe, Hennebont, Morbihan, Bretagne, France. It is open daily without charge.

The park was created in the late 19th century and restored in the 1960s. Today it contains 130 types of trees from around the world and 400 varieties of shrubs. Of particular interest are its century-old conifers and bamboos, as well as its neoromantic garden, cascades, stream, and pond.

See also 
 List of botanical gardens in France

References 
 Ville d'Hennebont: Parc botanique de Kerbihan
 Conservatoire des Jardins et Paysages entry (French)
 Je Decouvre la France entry (French)
 Guidinfo entry (French)
 Wikimapia entry
 Tiphaine Doré, Le Petit Futé Morbihan, Petit Futé, pages 110–111, 2007. .

Gardens in Morbihan
Botanical gardens in France